Reno is the fourth most populous city in the U.S. state of Nevada.

Reno may also refer to:

Places

Canada 
Reno, Alberta, a hamlet
Rural Municipality of Reno No. 51, Saskatchewan

Italy 
Reno (river), northern Italy
Rhine River, Reno in the Italian language

United States 
Reno, Georgia, an unincorporated community
Reno, Illinois, an unincorporated community
Reno, Indiana, an unincorporated community
Reno, Kansas, an unincorporated community
Reno, Minnesota, an unincorporated community
Reno, Ohio, a census-designated place
Reno, Pennsylvania, in the Borough of Sugarcreek, Pennsylvania
Reno, Lamar County, Texas, a city
Reno, Parker County, Texas, a city
Reno (Washington, D.C.), a former town and neighborhood in the District of Columbia.
Reno County, Kansas
Reno Lake, a lake in Minnesota
Reno Township (disambiguation)
Roman Catholic Diocese of Reno
Reno, Nevada
Fort Reno (disambiguation)

People
Reno (surname)
Reno (given name)
Reno (wrestler), ring name of retired professional wrestler Rick Cornell

Fictional characters
Reno, a member of the "Turks" in the videogame Final Fantasy VII

Arts and entertainment
Reno (1923 film), an American silent film
Reno (1930 film), an American silent film
Reno (1939 film), directed by John Farrow
"Reno" (Doug Supernaw song), 1993
"Reno" (Dottie West song), 1968
"Reno" (Bruce Springsteen song), 2005 on his album Devils & Dust

Sports
Reno Air Races, airplane competition
FC Reno, a Jamaican football team
Reno Open, a golf tournament in 1990 and 1991

Transportation
Renault, a French automaker which is sometimes pronounced as "Reno"
Suzuki Reno, a compact car
Reno Air, a passenger airline based in Reno, Nevada, which operated from 1992 to 1999
Reno station, a train station in Reno, Nevada
Reno, first American-type 4-4-0 locomotive, built in 1872 for the Virginia and Truckee Railroad

In the military
USS Reno (DD-303), American destroyer sunk during World War I, named after Walter E. Reno
USS Reno (CL-96), American cruiser, named after the city of Reno, Nevada

Other uses
A shortened version of the word renovation
Reno, an alternative name for Italian wine made from the Riesling grape
The TCP Reno congestion avoidance algorithm
Reactor Experiment for Neutrino Oscillation (RENO)
Reno, an OPPO phone brand
Reno, a Filipino food product brand commonly associated with Liver spread

See also
El Reno (disambiguation)
Reno Center, an apartment complex in Karachi, Pakistan
Reino (disambiguation)